Marija Milutinović Punktatorka (1810-1875) was a Serbian lawyer. She was the first female lawyer and attorney in Serbia and in the world. In 1847, she was given special permission to perform as a lawyer, which was unique not only in Serbia but in the world.  She exclusively did pro bono work for charity throughout her career.

References

 Sara L. Kimble, Marion Röwekamp, New Perspectives on European Women's Legal History

1810 births
1875 deaths
19th-century Serbian lawyers
19th-century Serbian women